was a town located in Ukiha District, Fukuoka Prefecture, Japan.

As of 2003, the town had an estimated population of 17,223 and a density of 608.80 persons per km². The total area was 28.29 km².

On March 20, 2005, Yoshii, along with the former town of Ukiha (also from Ukiha District), was merged to create the city of Ukiha.

See also
Groups of Traditional Buildings

External links
Ukiha official website 

Dissolved municipalities of Fukuoka Prefecture
Populated places disestablished in 2005
2005 disestablishments in Japan